The Finn dinghy is a single-handed, cat-rigged sailboat, and a former Olympic class for men's sailing.  Since its debut at the 1952 Summer Olympics in Helsinki, the Finn has featured in every summer Olympics, making it the longest serving dinghy in the Olympic Regatta and one of the most prolific Olympic sailboats, currently filling the slot for the Heavyweight Dinghy. The Finn is a physically demanding boat to race at the highest levels, especially since the class rules now allow unlimited boat rocking and sail pumping when the wind is above 10 knots. The event will not feature on the Olympic programme from 2024.

Design

The Finn was designed by Swedish canoe designer, Rickard Sarby, in 1949 for the Helsinki Olympics.

in 1952 the hulls were built of timber and the sails were of cotton. Initially there was little understanding of the role of a mast which could bend to reduce power. However over time the Finn sailors learned how to plane timber off the front of their masts for heavy winds and to glue on strips of timber on the front of the masts for lighter winds. 

Although the Finn hull has changed little since then, there have been developments to the rig. The original spars were made of wood until the late 1960s and early 1970s, when there was a gradual change to aluminum masts. Aluminum masts are significantly more flexible and allow more control over sail shape, and became commonplace after the 1972 Summer Olympics in Munich when they were first supplied to Olympic sailors. More recently, carbon fiber masts have become commonplace in competition Finns.

The sails, too, have evolved and are now commonly made of various laminates such as Technora, polyester, and Kevlar.

The class rules are overseen by the International Finn Association.

Events

Olympic Games

Multiple World Champions

Finn World Championship (Gold Cup)

The Finn Gold Cup serves as the World Championship for the Finn class.

Finn Junior World Championship (Silver Cup)

Masters Finn World Championship

Continental Championships
 2006 Finn Open European Championship

References

External links

 International Finn Association

 
Classes of World Sailing
Dinghies
Olympic sailing classes
1940s sailboat type designs
Sailboat type designs by Swedish designers
Sailboat types built by Newport Boats
Sailboat types built by W. D. Schock Corp